Engin Bekdemir (born 7 February 1992) is a professional footballer who plays as an attacking midfielder for TFF Second League club Ankaraspor. Born in Belgium, he has represented Turkey at international levels up to under-21s.

Career

Kayserispor
Engin Bekdemir joined Kayserispor from Portuguese club Porto during 2011 summer transfer period. He made his Turkish Süper Lig debut in the starting line-up in which Kayserispor were beaten by Fenerbahçe with 0–1 final score, on 23 September 2011.

Statistics
Correct as of 30 June 2015.

Personal life
Bekdemir is the youngest of four siblings. He belongs to a family originally from Giresun, Turkey, that immigrated to Belgium.

References

External links
 
 
 
 Profile at Eurosport
 Profile at Goal.com
 
 
 

1992 births
Living people
Turkish footballers
Belgian footballers
K. Beringen F.C. players
FC Porto players
PSV Eindhoven players
Kayserispor footballers
Çaykur Rizespor footballers
Eskişehirspor footballers
Ankaraspor footballers
Gençlerbirliği S.K. footballers
Altınordu F.K. players
Fatih Karagümrük S.K. footballers
Süper Lig players
TFF First League players
TFF Second League players
People from Beringen, Belgium
Belgian people of Turkish descent
Association football midfielders
Turkey B international footballers
Turkey under-21 international footballers
Turkey youth international footballers
Footballers from Limburg (Belgium)
Belgian expatriate sportspeople in Portugal
Belgian expatriate sportspeople in the Netherlands
Belgian expatriate footballers
Expatriate footballers in Portugal
Expatriate footballers in the Netherlands
Turkish expatriate footballers
Turkish expatriate sportspeople in Portugal
Turkish expatriate sportspeople in the Netherlands